Great Russell Street is a street in Bloomsbury, London, best known for being the location of the British Museum. It runs between Tottenham Court Road (part of the A400 route) in the west, and Southampton Row (part of the A4200 route) in the east. It is one-way only (eastbound) between its western origin at Tottenham Court Road and Bloomsbury Street.

The headquarters of the Trades Union Congress is located at Nos. 23–28 (Congress House).  The street is also the home of the Contemporary Ceramics Centre,  the gallery for the Craft Potters Association of Great Britain; as well as the High Commission of Barbados to the United Kingdom. The Queen Mary Hall and YWCA Central Club, built by Sir Edwin Lutyens between 1928 and 1932, was at No 16-22 (it is now a hotel).

Famous residents 

Great Russell Street has had a number of notable residents, especially during the Victorian era, including:
 W. H. Davies (1871–1940), poet and writer, lived at No. 14 (1916–22).
 Randolph Caldecott (1846–1886), illustrator, lived at No. 46.
 Thomas Henry Wyatt (1807–1880), architect, lived at No. 77.
 D. E. L. Haynes (1913–1994), classical scholar and British Museum curator, lived at No. 89.
 Percy Bysshe Shelley (1792–1822), poet, lodged at No. 119 (February–March 1818).

See also 
Adjoining streets:
 Bloomsbury Square
 Museum Street
Cultural institutions and sites
 The British Museum
 Faber and Faber, distinguished publisher (e.g., T.S. Eliot's The Waste Land)
 The park and garden in Bloomsbury Square
 Statue of parliamentarian Charles James Fox
 British Study Centres School of English
Nearby:
 The Cartoon Museum
 St. George's church
 Dominion Theatre

References

External links 

Streets in the London Borough of Camden
British Museum
Bloomsbury